Thecocarpus is a genus of flowering plants belonging to the family Apiaceae.

Its native range is Southern Turkey to Iran.

Species:

Thecocarpus carvifolius 
Thecocarpus meifolius

References

Apioideae